The Oak Ridge Bombers were a Minor League Baseball team that played in the Class D Mountain States League in 1948. The Bombers were located in Oak Ridge, Tennessee, and were named for the city's association with the Manhattan Project and the development of the first atomic bomb. They played their home games at Ridgeview Park.

Poor fan support caused the Bombers to operate at a loss from Opening Day. By the second week of June, the team had the league's lowest attendance despite having the league's best record. On June 10, in first place with a 24–11 (.686) record, owner Bob Broome relocated the team to Hazard, Kentucky, where they became the Hazard Bombers.

Across both Oak Ridge and Hazard, the Bombers accumulated a 65–43 (.602) record, placing second. They defeated the Pennington Gap Miners in the semifinals, three games to none, but lost the playoff championship finals to the Morristown Red Sox, three games to two.

References

External links
Statistics from Baseball-Reference

1948 establishments in Tennessee
1948 disestablishments in Tennessee
Baseball teams established in 1948
Baseball teams disestablished in 1948
Defunct baseball teams in Tennessee
Defunct Mountain States League (1948–1954) teams
Professional baseball teams in Tennessee
Oak Ridge, Tennessee